Bezirk St. Pölten-Land is a district of the state of Lower Austria in Austria. It completely surrounds the city of Sankt Pölten, which exists as a separate entity and borders Vienna to the west.

Municipalities
 Altlengbach
 
 Asperhofen
 
 Böheimkirchen
 
 Brand-Laaben
 
 Eichgraben
 
 Frankenfels
 
 Gablitz
 Gerersdorf
 
 Hafnerbach
 
 Haunoldstein
 
 Herzogenburg
 
 Hofstetten-Grünau
 
 Inzersdorf-Getzersdorf
 
 Kapelln
 
 Karlstetten
 
 Kasten bei Böheimkirchen
 
 Kirchberg an der Pielach
 
 Kirchstetten
 
 Loich
 
 Maria Anzbach
 
 Markersdorf-Haindorf
 
 Mauerbach
 
 Michelbach
 
 Neidling
 
 Neulengbach
 
 Neustift-Innermanzing
 
 Nußdorf ob der Traisen
 
 Ober-Grafendorf
 
 Obritzberg-Rust
 
 Pressbaum
 
 Prinzersdorf
 
 Purkersdorf
 Pyhra
 
 Rabenstein an der Pielach
 
 Schwarzenbach an der Pielach
 
 Sankt Margarethen an der Sierning
 
 Statzendorf
 
 Stössing
 
 Traismauer
 
 Tullnerbach
 
 Weinburg
 
 Weißenkirchen an der Perschling
 
 Wilhelmsburg
 
 Wölbling
 
 Wolfsgraben

Changes
At the end of 2016 the district absorbed Gablitz, Mauerbach, Pressbaum, Purkersdorf, Tullnerbach and Wolfsgraben from the defunct Wien-Umgebung District.

References

 
Districts of Lower Austria